Jackie McKeown (born John McKeown; 17 February 1971) is the Scottish former lead singer and guitarist for the Glasgow indie rock band The Yummy Fur who plays in 1990s.

Early life
Born in Bellshill, Scotland, McKeown grew up in Blantyre near Glasgow.  His early teenage years were coloured by obsessions with David Bowie and European art cinema. At the age of 16 he began playing guitar and writing songs, forming his first bands, Glass Candle and Subliminal Girls, after leaving school in 1988.

Career

The Yummy Fur
Just prior to moving to Glasgow in 1992, he formed The Yummy Fur with Jamie McMorrow. He also performed in Cotton Gum and played guitar in LungLeg (his sister Jane's band) for a UK tour. In the late 90s he often played lead guitar for Comet Gain and performs on their album Tigertown Pictures (1999).

After The Yummy Fur decided to split in December 1999, McKeown turned thirty, got married and attended university for the first time, studying film theory. Having become tired of playing guitar, he formed a short-lived electronic pop band called The Girls with former Yummy Fur member and current Franz Ferdinand frontman Alex Kapranos which performed live only once (in Glasgow).

The Mars Hotel
In 2001 Mckeown began collaborating with The Yummy Fur's Paul Thomson, making absurdist electronic pop under the name 10,000 Volt Ghost. With the addition of Jenni McKenzie, this outfit became The Mars Hotel (Thomson soon leaving to form Pro Forma then Franz Ferdinand with fellow ex-Yummy Fur member Alex Kapranos) The Mars Hotel performed its last show on New Year's Eve 2004.

1990s
McKeown began writing and recording songs with Michael McGaughrin. This became 1990s with the addition of former Yummy Fur bassist Jamie McMorrow. It was at this time that the nickname 'Jackie' was given to him via his bandmates. After a handful of gigs, 1990s were signed to the label Rough Trade Records and released the albums Cookies (2007) and Kicks (2009). 1990s performed extensively throughout Europe, America, Canada, Australia, Japan and Brazil. Over the winter of 2010/2011, they recorded a third album but, since parting ways with RoughTrade, it remains unreleased.

Trans
It was announced on 21 August 2013 that McKeown will collaborate with guitarist Bernard Butler under the name of Trans. The band made their live debut at the 2013 Liverpool Psychedelic Festival. The band released two EPs.

Personal life
McKeown resides in Glasgow's West End.

References

External links
The Yummy Fur Official Site

20th-century Scottish male singers
Scottish rock guitarists
Scottish male guitarists
Living people
1971 births
21st-century Scottish male singers
21st-century British guitarists
The Yummy Fur members
People from Blantyre, South Lanarkshire